The Guardian is a 1984 American thriller film directed by David Greene and written by Richard Levinson and William Link. The film stars Martin Sheen, Louis Gossett Jr., Arthur Hill, Tandy Cronyn, Simon Reynolds and Tom Harvey. The film premiered on HBO on October 20, 1984.

Plot

The inhabitants of a New York City apartment building are plagued by burglaries and murder, and they have finally had enough. So they employ ex-military man John Mack (Louis Gossett Jr.) to protect their building as a security guard. Mack's techniques are precise and intense, and soon his overbearing and power-mad nature begins to chafe resident Charles Hyatt (Martin Sheen). Hyatt seeks Mack's removal, but will he have to forfeit his own safety in his quest for freedom?

The ending illustrates how Charles Hyatt comes to terms with the necessity of having a tough, no-nonsense security guard in order to protect the residents in their part of town (albeit reluctantly).

Cast
Martin Sheen as Charlie Hyatt
Louis Gossett Jr. as John Mack
Arthur Hill as Dr. Phil Julian
Tandy Cronyn as Lynn Hyatt
Simon Reynolds as Robbie Hyatt
Tom Harvey as Mr. Wicker
Maury Chaykin as Rudy Simbro
Anthony Sherwood as Mr. Chambers
Taborah Johnson as Mrs. Chambers
Dinah Christie as  Claire Julian
Kate Lynch as Fran
Bathsheba Garnett as Mrs. Jacobs
Hadley Kay as Jason
Wendy Crewson as Marlee Kramer
Sean McCann as Lt. Yaeger
Harvey Atkin as Mr. Wallace
Robert Reece as Beret
Al Bernardo as Mr. Andriola
Sharon Dyer as Mrs. Andriola
Alex Leslie as Lorraine
Marcia Diamond as Mrs. Wallace
John Dee as Fletch
John LeFleur as Stuart
Ross Petty as McCarthey

References

External links
 

1984 television films
1984 films
1980s English-language films
1984 thriller films
HBO Films films
Films directed by David Greene
Films scored by Robert O. Ragland
American thriller television films
Canadian thriller television films
1980s American films
1980s Canadian films